The passport of Kosovo (/ ) is a travel document that is issued to the citizens of Kosovo. The document facilitates international travel as well as serving as proof of citizenship. The issuance of passports is the prerogative of the Ministry of Internal Affairs, with the exception of diplomatic passports which are issued by the Ministry of Foreign Affairs. Kosovar passports comply with all the recommended standards set for machine-readable passports by the International Civil Aviation Organization (ICAO) (such as size, technology, security, layout, etc.), but the country/citizenship code RKS is not within ISO 3166 and thus not ICAO-endorsed. The passport design was disclosed on 14 March 2008.  

The first passports were issued on 30 July 2008 and as of 20 May 2009, 300,000 passports have been issued to the citizens of Kosovo.

The new design of the passport is a burgundy colour, with the coat of arms of the Republic of Kosovo in the middle of the cover page. The word "Passport" is written on the cover of the passport in Albanian, Serbian and English. All relevant identity information about the bearer is printed in these languages as well. For citizens that are 18 years old or older, the passport is valid for 10 years from the date of issue. 

Before the introduction of the new national passports, travel documents were issued by the United Nations administration with a maximum validity of 2 years. Those travel documents ceased being issued in 2008, with the remaining documents valid until 2010.

Biometric passport
The Kosovo biometric passport has been issued since 31 October 2011. In May 2011, the Ministry of Interior announced that biometric passports would be issued in the summer of 2011 after the winning firm is chosen and awarded the production of the passports.

Types 
There are four types of passports: Ordinary, Official, Diplomatic and Travel Document. An application fee of €25 is required.

Ordinary 
 Burgundy cover
 Issued to all citizens of Kosovo with a maximum validity of 10 years to facilitate private international travel.

Official 
 Maroon cover
 Issued to political staff within the Government as well as their family members with a maximum validity of 5 years.

Diplomatic 
 Black cover
 Issued to the President of the Republic, the Prime Minister, members of the Government, the President of the Constitutional Court, the President of the Supreme Court, Ambassadors as well as other diplomatic staff in embassies or consulates around the world, to the Ombudsperson, members of state delegations if so required, Government officials which have been appointed as representatives of the Government in various international organisations, diplomatic couriers as prescribed by law, and persons of interest as prescribed by the law with a maximum validity of 5 years.

Travel Document 
 Light Blue cover
 Issued to the citizens of Kosovo if the original passport has been lost or stolen, and/or it has expired. It can also be issued for group travel of no fewer than 5 persons and no more than 50. A Travel Document has a maximum validity of 30 days.

Identity Information Page 
The bearer page contains the following information:
 Type [P]
 Code [Country Code: RKS]
 Passport Number
 Surname(s)
 Given name(s)
 Place of Birth
 Date of Birth
 Citizenship [Kosovar]
 Sex
 Height
 Eye Colour
 Issuing Authority
 Personal Number
 Date of Issue/Expiry
In addition to a picture of the bearer's face, a fingerprint and the signature of the holder are also present on page 3.

Visa requirements 

As of 2023, Kosovar citizens had visa-free or visa on arrival access to 41 countries and territories, ranking the Kosovar passport 99th in the world in terms of travel freedom (tied with the Sri Lankan and Lebanese passports) according to the Henley Passport Index.

Recognition 

Kosovo's unilateral declaration of independence is not universally recognised. Countries like the United States do recognize Kosovo’s independence. Therefore, some countries may not accept passports issued by the Government of the Republic of Kosovo.

Only passports 
In addition, other countries have recognised the Kosovar passport as a travel document whilst not recognising Kosovo as a country. This situation is similar to that of the Taiwan passport, which many countries routinely process, even though they only maintain unofficial diplomatic relations with Taiwan.

The following countries have officially stated that they accept the Kosovar passport as a valid travel document, whilst not recognising Kosovo as an independent country:

 – Visa is affixed on a separate form

In addition there are countries to which people have apparently been able to travel on Kosovar passports, however where this is not officially stated policy or well established de facto
practice this is not an indication that such a travel can be repeated in the future. Countries that have reportedly been visited in this manner include:

Russia 

Russia does not recognise Kosovo as an independent state, nor does it recognise the Kosovar Passport as a valid travel document for everyday entry to Russia under normal circumstances. However, the Kosovar Passport can be used to enter Russia in special cases such as to attend or participate in events under the auspices of the International Olympic Committee and other international sporting organisations, which Kosovo is a member of. Russia issues visas in the form of special forms inserted into the Kosovar Passports. The Russian Embassy in Belgrade published a statement about use of the Kosovar Passport in Russia:
"It is only possible to enter the territory of the Russian Federation with passports of the so-called Republic of Kosovo in cases based on the fulfilment of international obligations of the Russian Federation as a side-recipient of an event, which is organised through multilateral structures, whose member or participant is the so-called Republic of Kosovo... For other purposes, the procedure of entry of persons with Kosovo passports to the territory of Russia has not changed. Namely, their entry is not possible."

Serbia 

Serbia does not recognise Kosovo as an independent state, nor does it recognise the Kosovar passport as a valid travel document. However, citizens of the Republic of Kosovo can freely enter Serbia and stay for 90 days with a valid identity card.

When the issuing of new Kosovar visas and passport stamps began in 2008, Serbia refused entry to people with entry and exit stamps of the Republic of Kosovo customs authority stamps or visas in their passports. In addition, border crossings from third countries (Montenegro, Albania, North Macedonia through land, many more through air travel) to Kosovo were considered illegal points of entry by Serbia, and it had created problems if one entered through there and then attempted to leave Serbia through another border crossing in Central Serbia or Vojvodina without a corresponding entry stamp. That practice, however, was soon abandoned and these are now simply over-stamped (nullified), which potentially could create new problems with long term Kosovar visas being annulled.

See also 
 International recognition of Kosovo
 Foreign relations of Kosovo
 List of diplomatic missions in Kosovo
 UNMIK Travel Document
 Visa requirements for Kosovar citizens
 Kosovo identity card

Notes and references 

The political status of Kosovo is disputed. Having unilaterally declared independence from Serbia in 2008, Kosovo is formally recognised as an independent state by 119 out of 193 (~62%, as of February of 2023) UN member states (with another 13 recognising it at some point but then withdrawing their recognition), while Serbia continues to claim it as part of its own territory.
 Notes

 

References:

External links 
 Kosovo Ministry of Internal Affairs presentation of the passport
 PRADO - Kosovo passport

Kosovo
Government of Kosovo
Foreign relations of Kosovo